The Wall is a 1998 made for TV anthology film that first aired on Showtime on May 24, 1998.

Overview
The film told three separate stories based on items left at the Vietnam Memorial.

Cast

The Pencil Holder
Edward James Olmos

The Badge
Savion Glover
Ruby Dee

The Player
Frank Whaley
Michael DeLorenzo

References

External links
 

1998 television films
1998 films
Showtime (TV network) films
1990s English-language films
American anthology films
American television films
Films directed by Joseph Sargent
Vietnam Veterans Memorial